Earl Keegan Jr. (December 10, 1921 – February 11, 1977) was an American politician who was a member of the Wisconsin State Assembly.

Biography
Keegan was born on December 10, 1921, in Milwaukee, Wisconsin. After graduating from St. John's Cathedral High School, Keegan attended Marquette University. During World War II, he served in the United States Army. He became a member of the Veterans of Foreign Wars, the American Legion and AMVETS, as well as the Society of the Holy Name. Keegan died February 11, 1977.

Political career
Keegan was elected to the Assembly in 1972, where he served the 8th district until 1975. Previously, he was Supervisor of Milwaukee County, Wisconsin from 1956 to 1968. He was a Democrat.

References

Politicians from Milwaukee
Democratic Party members of the Wisconsin State Assembly
Military personnel from Milwaukee
United States Army soldiers
United States Army personnel of World War II
Marquette University alumni
1921 births
1977 deaths
20th-century American politicians